Janglebari is a village located in Hamirpur District in the state of Himachal Pradesh, India.

Villages in Hamirpur district, Himachal Pradesh